Quinnipiac Bobcats basketball may refer to either of the basketball teams that represent Quinnipiac University:

Quinnipiac Bobcats men's basketball
Quinnipiac Bobcats women's basketball